Niels Hansen may refer to:

Niels Hansen (German footballer) (born 1983), German football midfielder
Niels Hansen (diplomat) (1924–2015), former German ambassador to Israel
Niels Ebbesen Hansen (1866–1950), Danish horticulturist and botanist
Niels Flemming Hansen (born 1974), Danish politician and MF
Niels Jacob Hansen (1880–1969), Danish opera singer who sang tenor
Niels Wal Hansen (1892-1972), Danish Olympic sailor
Niels Christian Hansen,  Danish portrait and genre painter
Niels-Jørgen Hansen, Danish darts player
Niels Hansen (Danish footballer) (1901–1987), Danish football goalkeeper who played on the Danish national football team

See also
Niels Hansen Stadium, a basketball stadium in Kalgoorlie-Boulder, Australia